Sheikh Rashid Shafique is a Pakistani politician who had been a member of the National Assembly of Pakistan from October 2018 till January 2023.

Political career
Shafique was elected to the National Assembly of Pakistan as a candidate of Pakistan Tehreek-e-Insaf (PTI) from Constituency NA-60 (Rawalpindi-IV) in 2018 Pakistani by-elections held on 14 October 2018.

Controversy
Rashid Shafique was arrested from Islamabad airport as soon as his return for promoting the disrespect of Prime Minister of Pakistan, Shehbaz Sharif in Holy Place of Madina, nominating him as an open promoter for liberalism, when linked to blasphemy of Islam. He was also nominated in a case filed against PTI leaders in Faisalabad.

More Reading
Sheikh Rashif Shafiq - National Assembly Profile

References

Living people
Pakistan Tehreek-e-Insaf MNAs
Pakistani MNAs 2018–2023
Year of birth missing (living people)